Liravi-ye Shomali may refer to:
 Liravi-ye Shomali, Iran
 Liravi-ye Shomali Rural District